Maharaja Kirit Bikram Kishore Manikya Deb Barma Bahadur (13 December 1933 – 28 November 2006) was the 185th and last King of Tripura, a princely state in northeastern India. His formal coronation was held in 1941, but he never gained the powers of a king.

Political career 

He succeeded his father, Maharaja Bir Bikram Kishore Debbarman. He was the nominal king for two years until the state's merger into India in 1949. Since he was a minor during this time, the state was governed by a Council of Regency headed by his mother Kanchan Prava Devi.

He was elected from Tripura East Lok Sabha seat on an Indian National Congress ticket and was elected thrice in 1967, 1977 and 1989.

Personal life 

He was born on 13 December 1933 in Calcutta to Maharaja Bir Bikram Kishore Debbarman Manikya Bahadur who was Maharaja of Tripura State and Kanchan Prava Devi daughter of the HH Sir Maharaja Yadvendra Singh, the King of Panna State.

He was married to Padmavati Raje 'Akkasaheb' Scindia (1942–64) eldest daughter of Maharaja Jivajirao Scindia of Gwalior State and Vijaya Raje Scindia, who died in 1965, in Kolkata. Later, he married Bibhu Kumari Devi, daughter to Raja Lav Shah. They had one son and two daughters. His wife and son Kirit Pradyot Deb Barman were also members of the Indian National Congress. One of his daughters, Pragya Deb Barman also contest election from Tripura East Lok Sabha seat in 2019 Indian general election.

See also 
 Manikya dynasty#List of kings
 Tripura (princely state)#Maharajas

References

Kings of Tripura
1933 births
2006 deaths
Lok Sabha members from Tripura
India MPs 1967–1970
India MPs 1977–1979
India MPs 1989–1991
People from Agartala
Mayo College alumni
Indian National Congress politicians from Tripura